Almond butter is a food paste made from grinding almonds into a nut butter. Almond butter may be "crunchy" or "smooth", and is generally "stir" (susceptible to oil separation) or "no-stir" (emulsified). Almond butter may be either raw or roasted, but this describes the almonds themselves, prior to grinding.

Compared to peanut butter 
Almond butter is an alternative to peanut butter for those with peanut allergies or who dislike the taste of peanuts. Almond butter contains significantly more fiber, calcium, potassium, iron, and manganese than peanut butter, and about half the saturated fat, although a slightly higher total fat content. Almonds, a type of tree nut, are not legumes, whereas peanuts are, so almond butter can be consumed by those looking to avoid legumes.

Nutrition

Almond butter is high in monounsaturated fats, calcium, potassium, iron and manganese. It is considered a good source of riboflavin, phosphorus, and copper, and an excellent source of vitamin E, magnesium, and fiber. Almond butter also provides dietary protein.

See also
 List of almond dishes
 List of spreads

References

Almond dishes
Nut and seed butters